Land of the Midnight Sun may refer to:

 Any of the world's northern regions above (or close to) the Arctic Circle, i.e. the Arctic
 Any of the world's southern regions below (or close to) the Antarctic Circle, usually Antarctica
 A nickname to the U.S. state of Alaska
 Land of the Midnight Sun (album), a 1976 album by Al Di Meola
 Land of the Midnight Sun, a song from the 2009 album Ancient Journeys by Cusco
 The Land of the Midnight Sun, a book in two volumes, by Paul Du Chaillu

See also
 Midnight sun, the phenomenon affecting the polar regions (and slightly lower latitudes) where the sun shines at local midnight around summer solstice